Furiani is a commune in the Haute-Corse department, on the island of Corsica, France.

Population

See also 
 Communes of the Haute-Corse department
 Tour de Furiani
 Railway stations in Corsica

References

Communes of Haute-Corse
Haute-Corse communes articles needing translation from French Wikipedia